Altdorf bei Nürnberg is a town in south-eastern Germany. It is situated 25 km east of Nuremberg, in the district Nürnberger Land. Its name literally means “Altdorf near Nuremberg”, to distinguish it from other Altdorfs.

History
Altdorf is first mentioned in 1129. In 1504 the town was conquered by the Free Imperial City of Nuremberg. In the 16th century, the city government of Nuremberg founded an academy in Altdorf, which became a university in 1622. The university lasted until 1809. Among the alumni of the University of Altdorf were the soldier Albrecht von Wallenstein and the philosopher and scientist Gottfried Leibniz.

Discovery of teleosaur fossils
Teleosaur remains have been known from Altdorf bei Nürnberg since 1832, but none have been placed in a specific genus yet.

Economy
Even though the times of its once famous university have long passed, Altdorf is the seat of several educational institutions. It is also the home of a number of mid-scale industrial enterprises.

Monuments
Altdorf's chief monuments are the church of St. Laurentius, the city hall and the Wichernhaus, which once housed the university. Altdorf also boasts some impressive remnants of its fortifications.

International relations

Altdorf bei Nürnberg is twinned with:
 Altdorf, Switzerland
 Colbitz, Saxony-Anhalt
 Sehma, Saxony
 Dunaharaszti, Hungary
 Pfitsch, South Tyrol (Italy)

Mayors

Gallery

Sons and daughters of the town

 Stephan Farffler (1633–1689), inventor
 Johann Fabricius (1644–1729), theologian
 Moses Ferst (1828–1889), successful businessman in the United States
 Konrad Mannert (1756–1834), professor and historian
 Friedrichs Lachs (1832–1910), Bavarian-Swedish brewmaster
 Dora Hitz (1856–1924), Impressionist painter
 Klaus Kreuzeder (1950–2014), saxophonist
 Klaus Wolfermann (born 1946), athlete (javelin thrower)
 Thomas Tuschl (born 1966), biochemist

Personalities who worked in the town
 Johann Richter or  Johannes Praetorius  (1537–1616), German mathematician and astronomer
 Wallenstein (1583–1634), military leader and politician in the Thirty Years' War
 Johann Christoph Wagenseil (1633–1705), polyhistor, legal scholar and orientalist; taught and died in Altdorf
 Gottfried Wilhelm Leibniz (1646–1716), philosopher and natural scientist, promoted in Altdorf
 Johann Pachelbel (1653–1706), composer, studied at the University of Altdorf
 Lorenz Heister (1683–1758), surgical professor at the University of Altdorf from 1710 to 1719
 Wolfgang Haffner (born 1965), Funk and jazz drummer

References

External links
 
 Official homepage of Altdorf

Nürnberger Land